Backlash is a 1986 Australian film directed by Bill Bennett.

Plot
Police officers Trevor Darling (David Argue) and Nikki Iceton (Gia Carides) escort a young Aboriginal woman Kath (Lydia Miller) to the New South Wales outback to stand trial. After getting stranded in the desert a bond grows between them. By the time they are rescued, both Nikki and Trevor believe Kath is innocent.

Cast
David Argue as Trevor Darling
Gia Carides as Nikki Iceton
Lydia Miller as Kath
Brian Syron as The Executioner

Production
Bill Bennett had raised $175,000 from the BBC and ABC to make a documentary about black tracker Jimmy James but was reluctant to proceed. He came up with the idea for the film and wondered if he could use the money to make a feature. Bennett got approval from the tax department and most investors to do this, with J C Williamson Ltd stepping in for the BBC and ABC. The final $50,000 of the budget came from Bennett himself.

Bennett wanted to add some levity in the material and so cast David Argue, who had impressed him on stage. He was impressed by Gia Carides' improvisational skills in theatresports and cast her to act alongside him. Nurse Lydia Miller rounded out the main cast.

During filming out near Broken Hill Bennett often clashed with David Argue, who quit a week before shooting ended. However he came back and completed the film.

Much of the dialogue was improvised by the actors on location.

Release
Bennett won 2 awards at the 1987 Cognac Festival du Film Policier for the film. The film was screened in the Un Certain Regard section at the 1986 Cannes Film Festival.

Bennett later claimed it was one of the most profitable films he had made.

References

External links

Backlash at Oz Movies

1986 films
Australian drama films
1986 drama films
Films directed by Bill Bennett
1980s English-language films
1980s Australian films
Films about Aboriginal Australians